Ankle breakers are small but deep holes drilled into drawbridges, stone bridges, and other defensive fortifications, in order to allow a slow moving party to cross easily, while causing a running person to twist their ankle and fall.

References

Castle architecture